Velimir Ilić (25 October 1925 – 17 June 2007) was a Yugoslav long-distance runner. He competed in the men's 5000 metres at the 1952 Summer Olympics.

References

External links

1925 births
2007 deaths
Athletes (track and field) at the 1952 Summer Olympics
Yugoslav male long-distance runners
Olympic athletes of Yugoslavia